Talal Mohammed Jazaa Al-Mutairi (born 3 March 1995) is an Kuwaiti footballer who plays as a forward.

Personal life
Talal older brother, Jaber, was also footballer.

References

External links
 

1995 births
Living people
Kuwaiti footballers
Kuwaiti expatriate footballers
Kuwait international footballers
Kuwait SC players
Dhofar Club players
Al-Shahania SC players
Kuwait Premier League players
Oman Professional League players
Qatari Second Division players
Expatriate footballers in Oman
Expatriate footballers in Qatar
Kuwaiti expatriate sportspeople in Oman
Kuwaiti expatriate sportspeople in Qatar
Association football forwards